The Rosa Khutor Extreme Park (Russian: Роза Хутор) under license from The Extreme Sports Company and part of the Extreme Hotel, Sochi development,  is a skiing venue located west of the Rosa Khutor plateau in Krasnaya Polyana, Russia. During the 2014 Winter Olympics in neighboring Sochi, it hosted the freestyle skiing events and the snowboarding events. Seating 4,000 in the freestyle skiing area and 6,250 in the snowboarding areas, it was first used in September 2012.

References

Sochi2014.com profile. - accessed 30 September 2010.

Venues of the 2014 Winter Olympics
Olympic freestyle skiing venues
Olympic snowboarding venues
Ski areas and resorts in Russia
Sports venues in Russia
Sport in Krasnodar Krai
Buildings and structures in Krasnodar Krai
Buildings and structures in Sochi
Freestyle skiing in Russia
Snowboarding in Russia